Adrian Cheng Chi-kong (born 1979) is a Hong Kong entrepreneur and business executive. He is the CEO and executive vice-chairman of the Hong Kong-listed New World Development, and executive director of jewelry company Chow Tai Fook. He is also the founder of K11, which has a portfolio of commercial, cultural and residential projects. He is the son of property developer Henry Cheng and grandson of Cheng Yu-tung.

Early life and education 
Cheng was born to Katherine Ip and Henry Cheng in 1979. He has two younger siblings, Sonia Cheng and Brian Cheng. Cheng is also the grandson of property developer, Cheng Yu-tung.

Cheng was educated in his teenage years in the United States, when he attended Taft School in Connecticut. Following his time at Taft, Cheng enrolled at Harvard University. Cheng graduated from Harvard University with a Bachelor of Arts (Cum Laude) honours degree. Cheng later went to Japan to study Japanese culture for a year.

He received an honorary Doctorate from the Savannah College of Art and Design (SCAD) and in 2014 an Honorary Fellowship from Lingnan University. He is now serving as Member of Dean’s Council in Harvard Kennedy School.

Business career 
Early in his career, Cheng was a banker at Goldman Sachs and UBS. In 2002, Cheng left UBS AG Cheng to join his family's business Chow Tai Fook Holdings. In 2002, he became executive director of the listed Chow Tai Fook Jewelry Group.

In March 2007, Cheng became executive director and a board member at New World Development, a Hong Kong-listed company. In 2012, he became joint general manager of New World Development and was also recognised by the World Economic Forum in the same year as a Young Global Leader. He later became executive vice-chairman of NWD in 2015.

In 2008, Cheng founded K11. It merges art and commerce, a concept which has been referred to as "cultural commerce."  Cheng's first K11 cultural-retail mall opened in Tsim Sha Tsui, Hong Kong in 2009. It later opened a branch in Shanghai. Since then, other branches have been opened in Guangzhou, Hong Kong, Shanghai, Shenyang, and Wuhan. He founded the K11 Art Foundation (KAF) in 2010, which focuses on promoting and supporting Chinese artists and their works. He initiated collaborations between internationally recognised museums and art institutions such as Palais de Tokyo in Paris, and Institute of Contemporary Arts (ICA) in London, showcasing Chinese artists. The foundation also has an art village in Wuhan. In 2012, Cheng featured in Fortune magazine's 40 Under 40 list. In 2013, he launched K11 Artmall. His work with K11 led him to be included in the ArtReview Power100 list several times since 2014, most recently in 2021.

Cheng focused on reinventing retail in many of the NWD projects. Aged 29, Cheng established the K11 brand. It merges art and retail, a concept which has been referred to as "cultural commerce." According to Town & Country magazine, it blends the usual retail experience with art, lessening the focus on the transactional part of retail and more about the experience. The concept came from K11's “art x commerce,” a business model it created after research revealed a shift in demand from older generations to millennials. This began with the launch of K11 Artmall in 2013, a hybrid of retail and art gallery. Cheng said his aim was to expose art and the artists to "a broader audience." This followed with K11 MUSEA in 2019, which according to Artnet was the centerpiece of Victoria Dockside. The cultural retail vision also expanded into mainland China with K11 ECOAST in 2022. One author referred to Cheng as a “pioneer of cultural commerce” after his 15 years development the concept.

In 2017, Cheng led the Victoria Dockside redevelopment of land held by New World since the 1970s, at a cost of $2.6 billion. As different phases of the development completed, new K11 ventures opened. This included K11 ARTUS, a luxury waterside residence that opened in the second half of 2019; the flagship K11 ATELIER, a Grade A office building; and Rosewood Hong Kong, a luxury hotel of New World. New World bought U.S.-based Rosewood in 2011.

His philanthropic work led him to be featured in the 2017 edition of Asia's Heroes Of Philanthropy, published by Forbes magazine. He also launched C Ventures (rebranded as C Capital in September 2022), an investment fund investing in fashion, media and lifestyle start-ups. In 2018, Cheng founded the K11 Craft and Guild Foundation, a non-profit organisation to identify fast-disappearing crafts and offer public initiatives.

In June 2019, he was named the "first global ambassador" of the Council of Fashion Designers of America (CFDA). In September 2019, Cheng presided over the announcement that New World would donate 3 million square feet of agricultural land to the government for public housing and related facilities, NGOs and to charities to develop social or transitional housing.  Up to a third of the land was to be donated to an affordable social housing project.

In 2019, Cheng was rewarded by the French government with Ordre des Arts et des Lettres. It was following K11's collaboration with Cannes Film Festival, which hosted its first ever film week in Hong Kong the same year. In October 2019, he became executive director of NWS Holdings, New World Development's infrastructure arm. On February 13, 2020, Cheng was named the executive chair of the New World subsidiary New World China Land, while keeping his role as executive vice-chairman of New World Development. As of 2020, he runs two private Hong Kong investment ventures: C Ventures and K11 Investment. Leaving his position as general manager, he was promoted to CEO of New World Development in May 2020. In October 2020, Cheng oversaw NWD's acquisition of the State Theatre Building in Hong Kong for redevelopment. A team of conversation consultants were setup to preserve the 68-year old building, which is a Grade 1 historical building. Towards the end of the same year, Cheng first mentioned his and New World Developments vision for improving environmental, social, and corporate governance in Hong Kong. Creating Shared Value, abbreviated to CSV, was Cheng's proposal which he defined as "a connection between social progress and business success." The first project he believed this could be delivered on was the State Theatre site.

During the Covid-19 pandemic, Cheng launched Lovewithoutborders. The movement aimed to provide international assistance to those that required help. The project subsequently donated over 1.5 million masks to Europe in early 2020. Donations were also made to low-income families in Hong Kong and a large shipment of over 1 million masks went to mainland China. In September 2021, Cheng announced the establishment of a new non-profit organisation, New World Build for Good. It aims to alleviate the housing shortage in Hong Kong. In November 2021, Cheng announced that he would build virtual land in The Sandbox’s metaverse.

In 2022, Cheng led an initiative to help underprivileged Hongkongers. The crowd-donation platform, Share for Good, allows for donations of goods and supplies from donors. Shortly after its launch, donations of essential supplies were made by the private sector on the platform, to assist those affected by coronavirus epidemic. 11 SKIES was announced as another concept developed by Cheng, which is to be located near Hong Kong International Airport. The announcement came in May 2022, and focuses on providing retail, dining and entertainment without the need to travel into the city. In June 2022, Cheng spoke about the expansion of subsidiary Humansa's health and wellness facilities in the Greater Bay Area. This followed a number of partnerships and acquisitions by the healthcare firm. In July 2022, it was announced K11 would be launching K11 ECOAST, the first of its kind in mainland China. The $1.4 billion development is to be constructed in Shenzhen on its waterfront.

In July 2022, Cheng was part of the Hong Kong honours list, when he received the Silver Bauhinia Star. The recognition came following his efforts to improve the city of Hong Kong. In October 2022, Cheng was a recipient of the Ordre national du Mérite from the French government. During the presentation of the award, Consul General of France Christile Drulhe, stated Cheng "has been working tirelessly to foster stronger relations between France and Hong Kong." During the same month, he also received an Honorary University Fellowship in The University of Hong Kong.

In November 2022, Cheng setup the WEMP foundation. The non-profit foundation was formed to nurture wellness and support good mental health for children in Hong Kong, following a rise in young people suffering with depression after the COVID-19 pandemic. The South China Morning Post reported WEMP would provide counselling for carers and/or parents, with financial aid also available for severe cases. In February 2023, it was announced that Cheng had been appointed as non-executive director and a co-chairman of Meta Media Holdings. As the largest fashion and luxury media organization in China, it was suggested by Forbes that Cheng could assist with the growth of the business internationally. Meta Media's share price rose by 201% on the day Cheng's appointment was announced.

Boards and committees
He is on the boards of companies such as New World Development and Chow Tai Fook Enterprises, among others. He is chairman of the China Young Leaders Foundation. On 13 January 2023, Cheng was appointed as a new member of the Board of Directors of the Financial Services Development Council (FSDC).

Cheng holds a number of art-focused board positions including, WKCDA Board Member of M+ from October 2016 to October 2018, a member of M+ Founding Benefactors, the major donors of M+, Visiting Committee of The Metropolitan Museum of Art, Board Member of Asia Art Archive, Trustee of Royal Academy of Arts, and Member of International Circle of Centre Pompidou.

On 17 Jan 2023, Hong Kong Government appointed Cheng as the chairman of a new arts and culture committee, Mega Arts and Cultural Events Committee, "seeking to bring big events back to the city". Later on 21 Feb 2023, Hong Kong Government appointed Cheng as one of the members of the Culture Commission for a period of two years from 1 Mar, 2023.

Personal life
Cheng is married to Jennifer Yu. He is known as a collector of contemporary art.

Cheng has two younger siblings, Sonia Cheng and Brian Cheng.

References

External links
New World Development Company : Dr. Adrian Cheng

Living people
1979 births
Hong Kong billionaires
Hong Kong businesspeople
New World Development people
Non-profit executives
Harvard College alumni
Taft School alumni
Members of the Election Committee of Hong Kong, 2017–2021
Members of the Election Committee of Hong Kong, 2021–2026